USCGC Cahoone (WPC/WSC/WMEC-131) was an  of the United States Coast Guard. Launched in 1927, she served until 1968.

Class history 
This class of vessels was one of the most useful and long-lasting in the Coast Guard with 16 cutters still in use in the 1960s. They were designed for trailing the "mother ships" along the outer line of patrol during Prohibition. They were constructed at a cost of $63,173 each. They gained a reputation for durability that was only enhanced by their re-engining in the late 1930s: their original 6-cylinder diesels were replaced by significantly more powerful 8-cylinder units that used the original engine beds and gave the vessels 3 additional knots. Ten were refitted as buoy tenders during the war and reverted to patrol work afterward.

Cutter history 
Stationed at Stapleton, New York, Cahoone took part in the rescue of survivors of the cruise ship , which burned off New Jersey in 1934. She was at Curtis Bay, Maryland, in 1936 and at Morehead City, North Carolina, in 1937. By 1940 she was at San Pedro, California, where she remained through World War II. From 1946 to 1954, she was at Mount Edgecumbe, Alaska. She was stationed at Galveston, Texas, until 1968.

External links 
 UBoat.net:USCGC Cahoone

References 
 USCGC Cahoone (1927) at US Coast Guard Historian, which cites:
 Cutter History File. USCG Historian's Office, USCG HQ, Washington, D.C. 
 Dictionary of American Naval Fighting Ships. Washington, DC: USGPO. 
 Robert Scheina. U.S. Coast Guard Cutters & Craft of World War II. Annapolis, MD: Naval Institute Press, 1982.
 Robert Scheina. U.S. Coast Guard Cutters & Craft, 1946-1990. Annapolis, MD: Naval Institute Press, 1990.

Active-class patrol boats
Ships built in Camden, New Jersey
1927 ships
World War II patrol vessels of the United States
Brown, Boveri & Cie